Schwarzatal is a town and a municipality in the district Saalfeld-Rudolstadt, in Thuringia, Germany. It was created with effect from 1 January 2019 by the merger of the former municipalities of Mellenbach-Glasbach, Meuselbach-Schwarzmühle and Oberweißbach. The name refers to the river Schwarza.

References

Saalfeld-Rudolstadt